Fox Cave in the village of Shmankivtsi, Chortkiv Raion, Ternopil Oblast.

General characteristics
Cadastral number - № 27, registered in the Ternopil Speleological Club "Podillya".

The cave has been known since ancient times. The description and survey were made on April 27, 1965 by speleologists of the Ternopil club "Podillya" Serhii Budennyi, Valentyn Piatapal, Ihor Martinyshyn.

By type the cavity is labyrinthine and erosive-corrosive.

The entrance to the cave was located on the northern slope of a small ravine on the left bank of the river Nichlava. Azimuth binding is the church with. Shmankivchyky - 305 ° at a distance of 2 kilometers.

The total length of the passages is 34 m, its area is 46 km and the volume is 70 m. The width of the passages in the cave is from 0.9 to 2.5 m, and the height from 0.5 to 1.8 meters.

Description
The cave is laid in gray sandstone of gray hue, it is horizontal, there are no cracks in the ceiling and walls. According to the genesis of formation, this cavity is of the corrosion-suffusion type. Clay deposits were observed at the bottom. In cross section it is flat, sometimes domed, had three dead ends, which fell sharply, but their end is not traced.

The cave is wet, but did not have constant watercourses, which has its own constant microclimatic regime, except for the entrance, which depended on weather conditions and seasons.
Refers to small caves, which are most often inhabited in ancient times by man. Unfortunately, the entrance to the cave was now covered with soil, which gradually sank down in the process of water erosion.

References 

Shmankivtsi